Pumping may refer to:

 The operation of a pump, for moving a liquid from one location to another
The use of a breast pump for extraction of milk
 Pumping (audio), a creative misuse of dynamic range compression
 Pumping (computer systems), the number of times data is transmitted per clock cycle
 Pumping (oil well), injecting chemicals into a wellbore
 Pumping (noise reduction), an unwanted artifact of some noise reduction systems
 Pumping lemma, in the theory of formal languages
 Gastric lavage, cleaning the contents of the stomach
 Optical pumping, in which light is used to raise electrons from a lower energy level to a higher one
 Pump (skateboarding), accelerating without pushing off of the ground
 "Pumping" (My Heart), a 1976 song by Patti Smith Group